The Fighting Pilot (aka Fighting Pilot) is a 1935 American action film directed by Noel M. Smith and starring Richard Talmadge, Gertrude Messinger and Robert Frazer. When an inventor develops a new type of aircraft, a crooked businessman attempts to steals the aircraft and its blueprints. The company test pilot, who is the boyfriend of the inventor's daughter, foil the criminals.

Plot
In Washington D.C., Mr. Jones (Rafael Storm) receives a telegram from Los Angeles asking him to secure rights to a newly designed aircraft from inventor F. S. Reynolds (William Humphrey). Later that day, Cardigan (Robert Frazer), a gangster, lies to Jones that Reynolds is not really interested in his offer. Cardigan tries unsuccessfully to buy the aircraft and its plans from Reynolds. Test pilot Hal Foster (Richard Talmadge) and his girl friend, Reynolds' daughter Jean (Gertrude Messinger), arrive and Hal throws Cardigan out.

Afterwards, Hal test flies the new aircraft and as he and Reynolds discuss its problems, Cardigan's henchmen arrive and steal the aircraft and the plans. Hal follows their car on his motorcycle and Berty ( Eddie Davis), Hal's goofy friend, follows in a car. Hal catches up with the henchmen and they engage in a brawl.

After Berty arrives, he and Hal go to Cardigan's Chinatown home, but Cardigan's Chinese butler refuses them admittance. As Cardigan phones Jones to let him know that the aircraft is secure at an abandoned desert airfield, Hal and Berty break into his headquarters and overhear the location of the aircraft. Hal is captured, but later Berty, disguised as a Chinese servant, releases Hal and they use one of Reynolds' aircraft to fly to the desert airstrip.

A government agent, who is also a pilot, arrives at Reynolds' headquarters, searching for Cardigan, and Jean guides him to the secret airfield. Cardigan's henchmen see Hal's approaching aircraft and try to chase him down, but he jumps from his aircraft into theirs and upon subduing them, lands the aircraft. Jean and the agent arrive. The agent arrests Cardigan and his men, and Jean and Hal embrace.

Cast

 Richard Talmadge as Hal Foster  
 Gertrude Messinger as Jean Reynolds  
 Robert Frazer as Cardigan  
 Eddie Davis as Berty  
 Victor Metzetti as Toughy 
 William Humphrey as Mr. Reynolds  
 Rafael Storm as Jones  
 Jack Cheatham as Barnes

Production
The Fighting Pilot was a low-budget affair that featured the stunts rather than plot or story. The star, Richard Talmadge, made a career of doing action films, and never rose far from the B-movie format.

The aircraft used in The Fighting Pilot, were:
 Kinner SportsterK c/n 150, NC14237
 Cycloplane C-1 c/n 3, NC12202
 Stearman C3B c/n 235, NC8820
 Travel Air 2000 c/n 322, NC3948
 Alexander EaglerockA1 c/n 752, NC6375

Reception
Reviewer Hal Erickson in Allmovie.com, stressed the stunts in The Fighting Pilot was a highlight.

References

Notes

Citations

Bibliography

 Freese, Gene Scott. Hollywood Stunt Performers, 1910s-1970s: A Biographical Dictionary, 2nd ed. Jefferson, North Carolina: McFarland & Company, 2014. .
 Katchmer, George A. Eighty Silent Film Stars: Biographies and Filmographies of the Obscure to the Well Known. Jefferson, North Carolina: McFarland & Company, 1991. .
 Pitts, Michael R. Poverty Row Studios, 1929–1940: An Illustrated History of 55 Independent Film Companies, with a Filmography for Each. Jefferson, North Carolina: McFarland & Company, 2005. .
 Wynne, H. Hugh. The Motion Picture Stunt Pilots and Hollywood's Classic Aviation Movies. Missoula, Montana: Pictorial Histories Publishing Co., 1987. .

External links
 

1935 films
1930s action films
American aviation films
American action films
Films directed by Noel M. Smith
Reliable Pictures films
American black-and-white films
1930s English-language films
1930s American films